The Krasin Nunataks are a small group of nunataks lying  southeast of Alderdice Peak in the Nye Mountains of Enderby Land, Antarctica. The features were plotted by the Soviet Antarctic Expedition, 1961–62, which named them after the Soviet icebreaker Krasin.

References

Nunataks of Enderby Land